The Prevention of Crimes Amendment Act 1885 (48 & 49 Vict. c. 75) was an Act of the Parliament of the United Kingdom. It became law on 14 August 1885.

It amended the Prevention of Crimes Act 1871, and provided that any person convicted of obstructing a constable or "peace officer" in the execution of their duty was guilty of a criminal offence against that Act. This would be punishable by a penalty of £5 (2009: £) or, failing payment, two months imprisonment with or without hard labour.

References
Oliver & Boyd's new Edinburgh almanac and national repository for the year 1886. Oliver & Boyd, Edinburgh, 1886

United Kingdom Acts of Parliament 1885
1885 in British law